This is a list of NCAA Division I men's soccer coaches.

Conference affiliations are current for the next NCAA soccer season in 2023.

America East Conference

As of May 10, 2022

American Athletic Conference

As of December 25, 2022

ASUN Conference

As of December 25, 2022

Atlantic 10 Conference

As of June 2, 2021

Atlantic Coast Conference

As of June 2, 2021

Big East Conference

As of December 25, 2022

Big South Conference

As of June 2, 2021

Big Ten Conference

As of June 2, 2021

Big West Conference

As of June 2, 2021

Colonial Athletic Association

As of December 25, 2022

Horizon League

As of June 2, 2021

Independent
Two schools competed as independents in the 2022 season—Hartford and Incarnate Word. As part of its ongoing transition to NCAA Division III, Hartford will join the D-III Commonwealth Coast Conference in July 2023. After the 2022 season, full independent Chicago State, which had played that season in the Mid-American Conference, was left behind when that conference shut down its men's soccer league, and Liberty was set to leave the ASUN Conference for the non-sponsoring Conference USA. None of these schools have announced a future men's soccer affiliation.

As of December 25, 2022

Ivy League

As of June 2, 2021

Metro Atlantic Athletic Conference

As of May 10, 2022

Missouri Valley Conference

As of December 25, 2022

Northeast Conference

As of May 10, 2022

Pac-12 Conference

As of June 2, 2021

Patriot League

As of June 2, 2021

Southern Conference

As of June 2, 2021

Summit League

As of May 11, 2022

Sun Belt Conference
As of December 25, 2022

West Coast Conference

As of June 2, 2021

Western Athletic Conference
As of December 25, 2022

See also
List of current NCAA Division I baseball coaches
List of current NCAA Division I men's basketball coaches
List of current NCAA Division I women's basketball coaches
List of current NCAA Division I FBS football coaches
List of current NCAA Division I FCS football coaches
List of current NCAA Division I men's ice hockey coaches

References

 
Soccer coaches